Black Mesa State Park is an Oklahoma state park  in Cimarron County, near the western border of the Oklahoma panhandle and New Mexico. The mesa was named for the layer of black lava rock that coats it.

The associated nature preserve is open to hiking and contains  and is home to 23 rare plants and 8 rare animal species.

The nearest community is Kenton, Oklahoma. The nearest town is Boise City, Oklahoma.

The park is the darkest sky for any state park site in Oklahoma, with the site being a Bortle 1 zone; thus, making the park a big attraction for astronomers to view the night sky.

Lake Carl Etling
Lake Carl Etling, also called Carl Etling Lake, was formed in 1959 by a dam built on South Carrizo Creek and is contained within Black Mesa State Park.

External links
 "Black Mesa Area." Tulsa Audubon Society. Updated May 2010. Retrieved December 4, 2013.
 Suneson, Neil H. and Kenneth V. Luna. "A Field Trip Guide to the Geology of the Black Mesa State Park Area, Cimarron County, Oklahoma." Oklahoma Geological Survey. (1999). Retrieved December 4, 2013.

References

Protected areas of Cimarron County, Oklahoma
State parks of Oklahoma